Canal Road is an Australian television drama series on the Nine Network. The series was produced in-house, under producer Susan Bower, in collaboration with writers Sarah Smith, John Ridley and Dave Warner, and directed by Kevin Carlin. It was filmed at Channel Nine’s GTV Studio 11 and on location in and around Melbourne. The series reportedly cost A$10 million to produce.

The 13-part series went to air from 16 April 2008. The series debuted to mixed critical reception and only average ratings, which were further eroded when the series was moved to a later timeslot. Nine removed Canal Road from its schedules after the seventh episode, which drew in only 360,000 viewers; however the eighth episode was still made available online. Nine eventually aired the remaining episodes during August and December 2008.

Canal Road was released on DVD on 4 August 2008 in Australia.

Synopsis
Canal Road is a medical and legal advisory centre where the lives of inner-city professionals and their patients entwine in a story of mystery and intrigue. At the heart of the series are the tragic deaths of the wife and son of central character Spencer MacKay. Spencer is the centre's psychiatrist who is confronted by the killer of his loved ones and sets out on a journey of revenge which will implicate friends, workmates and his darkest demons.

Cast 

 Paul Leyden as Spencer MacKay
 Diana Glenn as Olivia Bates
 Brooke Satchwell as Bridget Keenan
 André De Vanny as Danny Havesco
 Patrick Brammall as Steve Yunnane
 Peta Sergeant as Holly Chong
 Charlie Clausen as Tom Squires
 Alyssa McClelland as Skye Brady
 Sam Anderson as Henry Walter
 Grant Bowler as Detective Ray Driscoll
 Sibylla Budd as Daina Connelly

Internet downloads
Since 1 April 2008, full episodes of Canal Road were offered as a free download as part of ninemsn's "Catch Up TV" service, with new episodes made available before their broadcast on Nine. In order to view them a third-party video player must be downloaded, which includes advertisements in the file and disables the ability to skip the ads.

Episodes were later made available for purchase through the iTunes Store.

Episode list

Ratings

See also
 List of Australian television series

References

External links
 Canal Road website
 Catch Up TV – Canal Road – Full episode downloads of Canal Road
 

2008 Australian television series debuts
2008 Australian television series endings
Australian drama television series
Nine Network original programming
Television shows set in Victoria (Australia)